Tajikfilm is a Tajik (former Soviet) film studio. Tajikfilm was founded in 1930 as a newsreel studio; the studio released its first feature film in 1932 and its first talky in 1935. In 1941 Tajikfilm merged with Soyuzdetfilm, only to reemerge in 1943. The studio produced films in both Russian and Tajik.

The studio is based in Dushanbe, Tajikistan.

Since 1993, not a single film has been shot at the film studio due to lack of funding. The film studio staff survived on small international orders for video films and videos. In 2005, "Tajikfilm" began filming a large-scale epic "Shamsiddin Shohin" - about the life of a Tajik classic.

Films
Smert' rostovschika (Смерть ростовщика) – 1966.
Skazanie o Rustame (Сказание о Рустаме) – 1972.
Rustam i Suhrab (Рустам и Сухрaб) – 1972.
Zvezda v nochi (Звезда в ночи) – 1972.
Tayna predkov (Тайна предков) – 1972.
Skazanie o Siyavysche (Сказание о Сиявуше) – 1976.
The Bodyguard – 1979.
 (В талом снеге звон ручья) – 1983.
Semeinye tainy (Семейные тайны) – 1985.
Govoryaschii rodnik (Говорящий родник) – 1986.
The Last Night of Scheherazade — 1987

References

External links
 
 Movies Dictionary

Film production companies of the Soviet Union
Film studios
Cinema of Tajikistan
1930 establishments in the Soviet Union
Mass media companies established in 1930